Jan Egon Staaf (born 11 January 1962 in Västerås) is a retired race walker from Sweden. He twice competed for his country at the Summer Olympics: in 1988 and 1996. Staaf set his personal best (1:22.37) in the men's 20 km walk event in 1997.

Jan Staaf is a Detective Inspector at the Swedish police.

Achievements

References

1962 births
Living people
Swedish male racewalkers
Athletes (track and field) at the 1988 Summer Olympics
Athletes (track and field) at the 1996 Summer Olympics
Olympic athletes of Sweden
Sportspeople from Västerås